National Academy of Science and Technology recognizes worthy contributions of Filipino scientists in the advancement of science and technology in the country during its Annual Scientific Meeting. It includes the following recognitions: Outstanding Young Scientists (OYS), The World Academy of Sciences for Developing Countries (TWAS) Prize for Young Scientists in the Philippines, NAST Talent Search for Young Scientists, NAST Environmental Science Award, NAST-LELEDFI Award for Outstanding Research in Tropical Medicine, Outstanding Scientific Papers, Outstanding Books and Outstanding Monographs.

Outstanding Young Scientists 
The Outstanding Young Scientists (OYS) is given to young Filipino scientist (younger than 41 years old) who have made significant contributions to science. Recipients include Rodolfo Cabangbang, agronomist, 1982.

The World Academy of Sciences for Developing Countries (TWAS) Prize for Young Scientists in the Philippines 
The TWAS Prize for Young Scientist is given to outstanding young Filipino scientists (must not be 41 years) by the NAST in the fields of Biology, Chemistry, Mathematics, or Physics.

NAST Environmental Science Award

NAST-LELEDFI Award for Outstanding Research in Tropical Medicine

NAST Talent Search for Young Scientist

Other NAST Awards 
 Outstanding Book or Monograph Award: given to books and/or monographs written by a majority of Filipino authors and published by Filipino publishers based in the Philippines within five years preceding the award. 
 Outstanding Scientific Paper Award: given to outstanding scientific papers published in Philippine scientific or technical journals within five years preceding the award.

References 

Philippine science and technology awards